Leo Howard "Ted" Coneybeare (March 1925 - 16 January 2012) was a Canadian TV producer and educational consultant for acclaimed Canadian TV series Polka Dot Door produced for TV Ontario from 1972 to 1984.

Early life and education 
He was born in a farming family to Howard and Evelyn (Bloom) in March 1925 at Essex County, Canada . He studied in Essex High School and London Normal School. He graduated from University of Western Ontario, Assumption College  and Ontario Department of Education Summer Schools. In 1952, he received B.S. Education degree from Wayne State University, Detroit with a major in Art Education.

Personal life 
After living almost 40 years together, Coneybeare married Raymond Snell at Toronto's Metropolitan Community Church in October 2007. Snell died in 2010. Conybeare died two years later in 2012 at 86 years of age after a long battle with cancer.

Career 
He enrolled in Armed Forces of Canada in Second World War, before taking up his first teaching job in a rural school in Windsor; and later adopted TV production as full time occupation. As educational supervisor, educator, and Producer, he made over 400 episodes of TV programme. Coneybeare retired in 1982 but produced 30 more episodes of Polka Dot Door as a consultant before leaving the show for good. He also created two other series, "Guess What?" and "Tell Me a Story".

Awards 
Coneybeare is a recipient of several awards including a Gemini Award in 2010.

References

External links 
 Polka Dot Door at IMDB

 

1925 births
Canadian television writers
Canadian television producers
Canadian television personalities
2012 deaths
Canadian Screen Award winners